The Apostolic Vicariate of Southern Arabia is an apostolic vicariate of the Catholic Church with territorial jurisdiction for Oman, United Arab Emirates and Yemen. The vicar apostolic of the vicariate is Paolo Martinelli, OFM Cap. It was first established in 1888 (as the Apostolic Vicariate of Aden) and took its current name in 2011. The see of the vicar apostolic is in St. Joseph's Cathedral in Abu Dhabi. Since 1916 it has been in the care of the Capuchins of Florence.

History 
The territory was originally part of the Vicariate Apostolic of the Gallas, but it was separated into an apostolic prefecture by Pope Pius IX on 21 January 1875. On 25 April 1888, Pope Leo XIII made the Apostolic Vicariate of Aden, located in Yemen. On the 28 June 1889, the name was changed to the Vicariate Apostolic of Arabia, responsible for the countries of the Arabian Peninsula and surrounding region: Bahrain, Oman, Saudi Arabia, Qatar, United Arab Emirates, Somalia and Yemen.

On 29 June 1953, the then Apostolic Prefecture of Kuwait (which has become the Apostolic Vicariate of Northern Arabia) was separated from the Apostolic Vicariate of Arabia. In 1973, the see of the jurisdiction was transferred from Aden to St. Joseph's Cathedral in Abu Dhabi. A subsequent redrawing of boundaries in 2011 reduced its jurisdiction to the countries of Oman, the United Arab Emirates and Yemen.

The vicariate has been governed by the Capuchin friars since 1916.

Apostolic Vicars of Arabia 
 Louis-Callixte Lasserre, OFM Cap. (1888 – April 1900)
 Bernard Thomas Edward Clark, OFM Cap. (21 March 1902 – 18 June 1910)
 Raffaele Presutti, OFM Cap. (13 September 1910 – 1915)
 Evangelista Latino Enrico Vanni, OFM Cap. (15 April 1916 – 1925)
 Pacifico Tiziano Micheloni, OFM Cap. (25 April 1933 – 6 July 1936)
 Giovanni Tirinnanzi, OFM Cap. (2 July 1937 – 27 January 1949)
 Irzio Luigi Magliacani, OFM Cap. (25 December 1949 – 1969)
 Giovanni Bernardo Gremoli, OFM Cap. (2 October 1975 – 21 March 2005)
 Paul Hinder, OFM Cap. (21 March 2005 – 31 May 2011)

Apostolic Vicars of Southern Arabia 

 Paul Hinder, OFM Cap. (31 May 2011 – 1 May 2022)
 Paolo Martinelli, OFM Cap. (1 May 2022 – present)

Statistics

Area
 929,969 km2

Population
Total population: 42,948,063
Total Catholic Population: 998,500 
Parishes: 16 
Diocesan priests: 17
Priests belonging to Religious Institutes: 51 
Total Priests: 68 
Permanent deacons living in the diocese: 1 
Professed non-priest Men Religious belonging to Religious Institutes: 1
Professed Women Religious belonging to Religious Institutes: 53

List of Churches under The Jurisdiction of The Vicar

United Arab Emirates 

Abu Dhabi - St. Joseph's Cathedral

Mussafah - St. Paul's Church

Al Ain - St. Mary's Church

Ruwais - St. John the Baptist Church

Dubai - St. Mary's Church

Jebel Ali - St. Francis of Assisi Church

Sharjah - St. Michael's Church

Ras Al Khaimah - St. Anthony of Padua Church

Fujairah - Our Lady of Perpetual Help Church

Oman 

Muscat   - Holy Spirit Church, Sts. Peter and Paul Church

Salalah - St. Francis Xavier Church

Sohar - St. Anthony's Church

Yemen 

Aden - Proto-Cathedral St. Francis of Assisi, Aden

Hodeidah - Sacred Heart Church

Sana'a - St. Mary Help of Christians Church, Sanaa

Taiz - St. Therese of the Child Jesus Church

See also 

 
 
 Catholic Church in the United Arab Emirates
 Catholic Church in Oman
 Catholic Church in Yemen

References

External links 
Apostolic Vicariate of Southern Arabia
 Interview with Mgr Paul Hinder about Catholicism in the region
Catholic Hierarchy.org entry
GCatholic.org
Video explaining the history of The OFM Cap. in Arabia

Apostolic vicariates
Catholic Church in Oman
Catholic Church in the United Arab Emirates
Catholic Church in Yemen
Catholic Church in Somaliland
Roman Catholic dioceses in the Middle East
Religious organizations established in 1888
Roman Catholic dioceses and prelatures established in the 19th century
Catholic Church in the Middle East
Apostolic Vicariate of Southern Arabia
Roman Catholic dioceses in Arabia
Roman Catholic bishops in the Middle East
Apostolic Vicariate of Arabia
Catholic Church in the Arabian Peninsula